is a Japanese magical girl manga series written and illustrated by Kentarō Satō. It is a spin-off of Magical Girl Apocalypse. The series is about a severely tormented, abused and suicidal high school student named Aya, who gains the ability to become a magical girl through a mysterious website. She soon finds friends, who are also magical girls like herself, that provide her strength. Aya and her friends also face enemies. The series becomes a climactic race for Aya because she must keep herself and her friends alive. It was serialized on Akita Shoten's Champion Tap! website from July 2013 to October 2017 and later in the shōnen manga magazine Weekly Shōnen Champion from October 2017 to August 2019, with its chapters collected in sixteen tankōbon volumes. The manga is licensed for English release in North America by Seven Seas. An anime television series adaptation produced by production doA aired from April to June 2018.

Plot

Aya Asagiri is a high school girl who has problems both at school with almost lethal bullying and at home from her brother Kaname's physical abuse. One day  a suspicious website pops up on her computer screen, showing a creepy-looking person. This person appears to take pity on her and announces that she will grant Aya magical powers. Later at school, Aya finds a gun that mysteriously appears in her locker. She is soon cornered by bullies and with nothing to lose, Aya fires the gun at them. The shot causes the bullies to disappear, but to her horror she finds out that they have somehow been killed by a train nearby. Aya feels as though she had somehow killed them, and is confused to find herself with longer red hair and blood flowing out of her eyes. She later finds out that she is not alone, when a classmate reveals that she is also a magical girl. The classmate, known as Tsuyuno Yatsumura, becomes one of her new friends, while offering to help her get away from "magical hunters" who kill magical girls and only steal their wands. Tsuyuno teaches Aya about the power she has acquired and the physical changes it brings on to her body. However, the two girls do not know the reason for something that resembles a countdown clock on the website, and they fear it may be something really bad. After meeting a group of other fellow magical girls, all with different powers and abilities of their own, Tsuyuno and Aya attempt to discover what the countdown really means, all while trying to make sure no one knows about their powers.

Media

Manga
Magical Girl Site is written and illustrated by Kentarō Satō. The series ran on Akita Shoten's Champion Tap! website from July 4, 2013, to October 5, 2017. The series was then transferred to the publisher's shōnen manga magazine Weekly Shōnen Champion, where it ran from October 26, 2017, to August 1, 2019. Akita Shoten collected its 139 individual chapters in sixteen tankōbon volumes, released from March 7, 2014, to October 8, 2019.

In North America, the series is licensed by Seven Seas Entertainment, who announced the acquisition in July 2016.

A spin-off series, titled , ran on Champion Tap! from October 26, 2017, to August 23, 2018.

Volume list

Anime
On September 8, 2017, an anime television adaptation was announced in the seventh volume of the manga. The series premiered on MBS, TBS and BS-TBS on April 7, 2018 and is directed by Tadahito Matsubayashi at production doA, with Takayo Ikami writing the scripts. The series is streaming on Amazon Prime Video worldwide. Keiji Inai is composing the music. The idol unit i☆Ris performed the opening theme song "Changing point", while Haruka Yamazaki performed the ending theme song . Sentai Filmworks have licensed the anime and will release it in both digital and home video formats.

Episode list

Reception
The English language version of Mahō Shōjo Saito (Magical Girl Site) has received various reviews from critics. Brittany Vincent from Japanator compared the series to Puella Magi Madoka Magica, calling the former "much darker". Vincent said that Magical Girl Site takes away everything someone may find dark about Madoka, and slices it "wide open" with its dark plot.

Notes

References

External links
  at Champion Tap! 
  - Anime adaptation 
 

2018 Japanese television series endings
Akita Shoten manga
Anime series based on manga
Animeism
Bullying in fiction
Child abuse in fiction
Dark fantasy anime and manga
Domestic violence in fiction
Fiction about assassinations
Fiction about monsters
Magical girl anime and manga
Manga adapted into television series
Mass murder in fiction
NBCUniversal Entertainment Japan
School life in anime and manga
Sentai Filmworks
Seven Seas Entertainment titles
Shōnen manga
Supernatural anime and manga
Works about the Internet